Velma is an American adult-oriented animated mystery horror comedy television series that was based on the character Velma Dinkley from the Scooby-Doo franchise. Developed and created by Charlie Grandy for HBO Max, it stars executive producer Mindy Kaling as the voice of the titular character, with Sam Richardson, Constance Wu and Glenn Howerton in supporting roles. Grandy also serves as the showrunner of the series. It revolves around Velma Dinkley and the other human members of Mystery Inc. before their official formation, making it the first television series in the franchise to not feature the Scooby-Doo character.

The series premiered on January 12, 2023. It received mixed reviews from critics, who praised the vocal performances, but were divided toward the humor and criticized its meta storytelling, characterization, and departures from the Scooby-Doo mythos.  Audience reception was overwhelmingly negative. A second season is in development.

Plot
The series serves as an alternate universe origin story for Mystery Inc., pitched as a "love quadrangle" between them. It primarily focuses on Velma Dinkley as she tries to solve a mystery regarding the disappearance of her mother, as well as the numerous murders of local teenage girls.

Voice cast

Main

 Mindy Kaling as Velma Dinkley, a snarky teenage would-be detective, who has a crush on murder suspect Fred Jones. She has a lifelong passion for solving mysteries that she inherited from her mother, but since her disappearance years prior, Velma is a lot more cautious regarding mysteries and has horrific guilt-based hallucinations whenever she attempts to solve one. She is partially modeled after Kaling and is portrayed as a bisexual South Asian–American.
 Glenn Howerton as Fred Jones, a popular but dimwitted 16-year-old murder suspect, and Velma's crush who is the heir to the Jones Gentlemen Accessories fashion line. He is also a noted late bloomer in terms of puberty. He is the only original Mystery, Inc. member depicted as primarily white, as in other Scooby-Doo media.
 Sam Richardson as Norville Rogers, Velma's best friend and a school news reporter, who has a crush on her and frequently brings up how much he hates drugs. He is portrayed as half-black and half-white, and is exclusively referred to by his real first name instead of his familiar nickname, Shaggy. He also does not share the original Shaggy's cowardice, although his love of snacks remains.
 Constance Wu as Daphne Blake, a popular girl and Velma's former best friend, who has "complicated feelings" for her. Raised by two adoptive mothers, Daphne hopes to discover her biological parents. This version is portrayed as East Asian American.

Supporting
 Russell Peters as Aman Dinkley, Velma's lawyer father, who struggles to keep her in line
 Melissa Fumero as Sophie, Aman's model girlfriend who also owns Spooner's Malt Shop. She is initially pregnant, but eventually gives birth to a girl in "Velma Makes a List".
 Sarayu Blue as Diya Dinkley, Velma's absentee mother who used to write mysteries, inspiring her daughter's passion
 Jane Lynch as Donna Blake, one of Daphne's two adoptive mothers, who is a slightly incompetent detective investigating Brenda's disappearance
 Wanda Sykes as Linda Blake, Daphne's other adoptive mother, who shares Donna's profession
 Ming-Na Wen as Carroll, Daphne's biological mother and a member of the Crystal Cove Gang
 Ken Leung as Darren, Daphne's biological father and a member of the Crystal Cove Gang
 Cherry Jones as Victoria Jones, Fred's mother who often spoils and babies her son.
 Frank Welker as William Jones, Fred's father who is ashamed of him. Welker has voiced Fred since the character's inception in 1969
 Nicole Byer as Blythe Rogers, Norville's African American mother and the Principal of Crystal Cove High
 Gary Cole as Lamont Rogers, Norville's white father who works as a therapist and Crystal Cove High's school counselor. He bears a resemblance to Shaggy's original design.
 "Weird Al" Yankovic as Dandruff Tuba, a student at Coolsville High. A running gag involves him getting frequently injured by the gang's antics.
 Fortune Feimster as Olive, a popular girl at the gang's school
 Yvonne Orji as Gigi, a cool girl at the gang's school
 Karl-Anthony Towns as Jacques Beau (Jock Bo), a handsome jock at the gang's school
 Shay Mitchell as Brenda, an attractive, popular girl at the gang's school who had her brain ripped out
 Debby Ryan as Krista, another attractive girl at the gang's school who is lobotomized in the same manner as Brenda
 Kulap Vilaysack as Lola, another attractive girl who is lobotomized in the same manner as Brenda and Krista
 Jim Rash as Dave, the self-proclaimed "cool" mayor of Coolsville
 Stephen Root as Sheriff Cogburn, the incompetent sheriff of Coolsville.

Episodes

Production
The series was first announced on February 10, 2021. On July 11, 2022, the trademark for the series was listed as abandoned, only for HBO Chief Content Officer Casey Bloys to confirm the series to still be in production in an August memo, with the series previewing at New York Comic Con on October 6, 2022. On February 13, 2023, Channing Dungey, the chairwoman of Warner Bros. Television Group, announced that a second season is in development.

Some of the characters are notably raceswapped. In an interview with Entertainment Weekly, Mindy Kaling explains that "the essence of Velma is not necessarily tied to her whiteness. And I identify so much as her character, and I think so many people do, so it's like, yeah, let's make her Indian in this series." Unlike most Scooby-Doo incarnations, this series will not feature Scooby-Doo himself due to studio mandates, combined with the crew struggling to come up with an adult take on the character. Matthew Lillard, the current voice of Shaggy Rogers in most Scooby-Doo media, expressed his support for the cast of Velma as opposed to his disappointment of not being cast in Scoob!.

Velma marks the second series to feature Frank Welker not voicing Fred Jones after A Pup Named Scooby-Doo, though Welker is still involved in the show by voicing Fred's father.

Release
The first two episodes of Velma were released on January 12, 2023, on HBO Max, with the rest of the episodes being released in weekly pairs until February 9, 2023. Notably, the series broke HBO Max's record for the biggest premiere day of an original animated show.

Reception

Critical response
Velma has received mixed reviews from critics. The review aggregator website Rotten Tomatoes reported a 40% approval rating with an average rating of 5.9/10 based on 35 critics. The website's critics consensus reads, "Jinkies! This radical reworking of the beloved Mystery Team has plenty of attitude and style, but it doesn't have the first clue for how to turn its clever subversion into engaging fun". Metacritic, which uses a weighted average, assigned a score of 56 out of 100 based on 15 critics, indicating "mixed or average reviews". 

Saloni Gajjar of AV Club gave the show a positive review, praising most of the humor, characterization, storytelling, voice cast, and creative liberties, but stating that sometimes the show falls victim to the tropes it mocks. She concluded the review by saying, "This isn't the Velma we're used to, but it's the Velma we deserve to enjoy today." Darren Franich of Entertainment Weekly was far more negative and gave the show a C, describing it as a "self-aware slog" and "so extra it's minus." He criticized the strong emphasis on pop-culture references and meta humor, and how they tend to bury the few bright spots. Richard Roeper of the Chicago Sun-Times gave it two out of four stars and stated that "at times the humor is smart and spot-on, but it quickly becomes exhausting. It's as if a team of very clever scribes gathered in a writers' room and recorded everything they said – and then shoehorned all of it into the series."

Liz Shannon Miller of Consequence criticized the show's unbalanced tone, lack of focus, absence of Scooby-Doo, and overstuffed narrative. She also stated the series "feels a bit PG in comparison to other adult animation currently in the works." Conversely, Miller praised the voice acting as well as some of the gags, ending the review by hoping for a second season to iron out its flaws, having noted the show takes a "the first season is really the pilot episode" approach. In a mixed critique, Angie Han of The Hollywood Reporter praised the "thoughtful, emotionally honest" portrayal of Velma herself, but made note of how the show loves to poke fun at televised tropes, yet "seems somewhat less sure of what it has to offer in their stead." She stated how the series' "insistence that it's not like other shows grows thin" and criticized how the cast feels more like "joke machines" than individual characters.

Writing for IGN, Brittany Vincent criticized the series' portrayal of its title character, comparing her to "a biting, hateful version of Daria without the character growth," stating this aspect of the show holds it back from being what it strives to be. She did, however, praise the "side-splitting" comedy and the portrayals of Daphne and Fred, concluding that "ironically, the series would be exponentially better without its namesake – or at least a version of her with a bit more character growth." Paste Magazine's Rendy Jones gave the series a 5.8 out of 10, praising the art direction and voice performances, but describing the writing as "constantly at war with itself." They also compared it unfavorably to Scooby-Doo! Mystery Incorporated, which they deemed similar in intentions but superior in execution. Joshua Alston of Variety wrote the show is "irreverent to a fault," extolling most of the humor but stating it could belong to any other comedy series. He also criticized the portrayal of the Mystery Inc. gang, whom he described as "just really unpleasant to spend time with."

Audience response

Audience reception to Velma has been overwhelmingly negative. It became one of the lowest-rated television shows on IMDb, receiving similar low scores from audiences on Rotten Tomatoes and Google. 

Asyia Iftikhar of PinkNews noted in her reflection of audience reception that the show has become the subject of "relentless criticism" from accusations of "perpetuating stereotypes against South Asian women, criticised for poor attempts at self-aware comedy and slammed for losing the essence of what people love about the Scooby Doo gang." Brahmjot Kaur of NBC News wrote that the accusations of stereotypes had been rebutted by some who noted characters in other television shows invented by Kaling shared similar personality traits to the titular protagonist, while citing Kaling's past influences. Wireds Amos Barshad wrote that while there was likely still reactions of a racist and homophobic nature targeting the show, the main complaints were for it addressing diversity issues in a "flat, one-note manner", and that the portrayal of Velma's sexuality had divided fans. Lakshmi Srinivas, a professor of Asian American studies at the University of Massachusetts, felt that Kaling was being held to unfair standards as one of the few leading Asian figures in the entertainment industry.

Notes

References

External links
 
 

2020s American adult animated television series
2020s American horror comedy television series
2020s American LGBT-related animated television series
2020s American LGBT-related comedy television series
2020s American mystery television series
2020s American workplace comedy television series
2023 American television series debuts
American adult animated comedy television series
American adult animated horror television series
American adult animated mystery television series
Animated television series reboots
Asian-American television
Bisexuality-related television series
Coming-of-age television shows
English-language television shows
HBO Max original programming
Metafictional television series
Scooby-Doo television series
Teen animated television series
Television series by 3 Arts Entertainment
Television series by Warner Bros. Animation
Television shows set in the United States